Dana Puchnarová (born January 22, 1938) is a Czech painter, illustrator, and graphic artist.

Early life and education
A native of Prague, Puchnarová attended the Secondary School of Fine Arts from 1953 until 1957, and from 1958 until 1964 she was a pupil at the Academy of Fine Arts, Prague. In 1991 she joined the artistic faculty of Palacký University Olomouc, remaining there until 2003.

Career
She has participated in numerous solo and group exhibitions both at home and abroad. One of her prints is in the collection of the National Gallery of Art.

The asteroid 11105 Puchnarová, discovered by one of her former pupils, is named for Puchnarová. Her son is the artist and musician František Štorm.

References

1938 births
Living people
Czech women painters
Czech illustrators
Czech printmakers
Czech women illustrators
Women printmakers
20th-century Czech painters
20th-century printmakers
20th-century Czech women artists
21st-century Czech painters
21st-century printmakers
21st-century Czech women artists
Artists from Prague
Academy of Fine Arts, Prague alumni
Academic staff of Palacký University Olomouc